The ASEAN Academy of Engineering and Technology is a learned society of engineers and technologists, policy makers, the public, and the private sectors from Association of Southeast Asian Nations (ASEAN) member states. It was founded in 2004 and was registered with the ASEAN Secretariat as an accredited Civil Society Organization (CSO) on 11 July 2007.

Fellowships
Fellowship of the academy is awarded to individuals from academia, research institutes, industry, and government who have demonstrated successful leadership or outstanding contributions to engineering and technology over an extended period.  Fellowship of the AAET is in two categories:

Voting-Fellows 
 Distinguished Fellow;
 Senior Fellows; and
 Ordinary Fellows.

Non Voting-Fellows 
 Distinguished Honorary Fellows;
 Honorary Fellows;
 Foreign Fellows; and
 Associate Fellows.

Post-nominal letters
Each category of fellows of the ASEAN Academy of Engineering and Technology is entitled to use the respective post-nominal letters as follows:
 D. Hon. FAAET for Distinguished Honorary Fellow
 Hon. FAAET for Honorary Fellow
 D. FAAET for Distinguished Fellow
 SFAAET for Senior Fellow
 FAAET for Ordinary Fellow
 FAAET(F) for Foreign Fellow
 AFAAET for Associate Fellow

Pre-nominal letters
Distinguished Fellows and Senior Fellows are entitled to use the pre-nominal letters of Academician.

References

External links

Constitution of AAET
Kuala Lumpur Engineering Science Fair

Organizations associated with ASEAN
Engineering societies